Konrad H. Jarausch (born 14 August 1941 in Magdeburg, Germany) is a German-American historian and the Lurcy Professor of European Civilization at the University of North Carolina at Chapel Hill. The focus of his work has been German history, with his earlier work being on Hitler's rise to power, and his later work more concerned with East Germany, re-unification and cultural democratization. He is the son of a German soldier and considered a critic of the Third Reich(see Shattered Past).

He served as a president of the German Studies Association (1985–86) and as the editor of Zeithistorische Forschungen/Studies in Contemporary History.

Selected publications

 Jarausch, Konrad H.  Out of Ashes: A New History of Europe in the Twentieth Century, Princeton University Press (2015).
 Jarausch, Konrad Hugo. "Contemporary History as Transatlantic Project: The German Problem, 1960-2010;[on the Occasion of Konrad H. Jarausch's 70th Birthday, this Supplement... Presents a Retrospective of the Work Produced by this German American Historian]." Zentrum für Historische Sozialforschung" 2012. online
 Jarausch, Konrad H.   Reluctant Accomplice: A Wehrmacht Soldier's Letters from the Eastern Front, Princeton University Press (2011).
 Jarausch, Konrad H.   Gebrochene Wissenschaftskulturen : Universität und Politik im 20. Jahrhundert Göttingen: Vandenhoeck & Ruprecht (2010).
 Jarausch, Konrad H. After Hitler: Recivilizing Germans, 1945-1995 (2008)
 Jarausch, Konrad H.   “Das stille Sterben…”: Feldpostbriefe von Konrad Jarausch aus Polen und Russland, Paderborn: Schöningh (2008).
 Jarausch, Konrad H.   Shattered Past: Reconstructing German Histories, Princeton University Press (2002).
 Jarausch, Konrad H.  Dictatorship as Experience: Towards a Socio-Cultural History of the GDR  (1999)
 Jarausch, Konrad H.  The Rush to German Unity (1994)
 Jarausch, Konrad H. and Kenneth A. Hardy. Quantitative Methods for Historians: A Guide to Research, Data, and Statistics (1991)
 Jarausch, Konrad H. and Geoffrey Cocks. German Professions, 1800-1950'' (1990)

External links
 Rüdiger Graf, Konrad Jarausch. “Crisis” in Contemporary History and Historiography in "Docupedia Zeitgeschichte", March 27, 2017.

References

21st-century American historians
21st-century American male writers
20th-century German historians
German male non-fiction writers
Living people
University of North Carolina at Chapel Hill faculty
1941 births
Historians of Germany
American male non-fiction writers